George Harold Kojac (March 2, 1910 – May 28, 1996) was an American competition swimmer, two-time Olympic champion, and former world record-holder in two events.

Kojac represented the United States at the 1928 Summer Olympics in Amsterdam.  As a member of the winning U.S. team in the 4×200-meter freestyle relay, he received a gold medal.  Kojac and teammates Austin Clapp, Walter Laufer and Johnny Weissmuller set a new world record of 9:36.2 in the event final.  Individually, he won another gold medal in the men's 100-meter backstroke with a second world record time of 1:08.2.  He also finished fourth in the men's 100-meter freestyle in 1:00.8.

Kojac was born to Ukrainian immigrants. He attended DeWitt Clinton High School, and learned to swim in the East River in New York.  In 1931 he graduated from the Rutgers University and missed the 1932 Olympics because of his studies at Columbia Medical School.  During his swimming career Kojac set 23 world records.  In 1968 he was inducted into the International Swimming Hall of Fame.

See also
 List of members of the International Swimming Hall of Fame
 List of Olympic medalists in swimming (men)
 List of Rutgers University people
 World record progression 100 metres backstroke
 World record progression 4 × 200 metres freestyle relay

References

External links

  George Kojac – Olympic results from databaseOlympics.com

1910 births
1996 deaths
American male backstroke swimmers
American male freestyle swimmers
Burials at Arlington National Cemetery
World record setters in swimming
Medalists at the 1928 Summer Olympics
Olympic gold medalists for the United States in swimming
American people of Ukrainian descent
Sportspeople from New York City
Rutgers Scarlet Knights men's swimmers
Swimmers at the 1928 Summer Olympics
20th-century American people